Censorship of the Bible includes restrictions and prohibition of possessing, reading, or using the Bible in general or any particular translation of it. Violators of those Bible prohibitions have been punished by killing, imprisonment, forced labor, and banishment, as well as by burning or confiscating the Bible or Bibles used or distributed. Censorship of the Bible occurred in the past and is still going on today.

In the 20th century, Christian resistance to the Soviet Union's policy of state atheism occurred through Bible-smuggling. The People's Republic of China, officially an atheist state, engages in Bible burning as a part of antireligious campaigns there.

The Index Librorum Prohibitorum of the Catholic Church included various translations of the Bible. In most cases, the bans on pious lay people possessing or using Bibles were related to vernacular Bible editions. Clerics were never forbidden to possess the Vulgate Bible translation in the Latin language. From the point of view of most Protestants, the topic mostly refers to historical prohibitions of the Catholic Church against reading or possessing Bibles, not of the Latin Vulgate translation, or in the case of the laity, possessing any Bibles at all, including the Vulgate. From a Catholic point of view, the censorship of the Bible was done both by restricting Bibles from those lacking instruction and by censoring translations thought to encourage deviations from official Catholic doctrines.

Background 
The Old Testament was written mostly in Hebrew and partly in Aramaic. The New Testament was written in Koine Greek, a form of ancient Greek. The books were translated into several other languages, including Latin. From about AD 300 onward, Latin began to assert itself as the language of worship in Western Christianity. This was aided by the fact many European languages, called the Romance languages, are all descended from Latin. In contrast the earliest written Western Germanic languages date only from the 6th century. From AD 382-420, a new translation was made into the Latin vernacular, the Vulgate, which became the dominant translation for Western Christianity in the 7th-9th centuries. From about the 9th century it was regarded as the only valid Bible translation. In Eastern Christianity, on the other hand, Greek remained dominant.

Bible smugglers 

Modern censorship of the Bible has met with resistance from groups such as Open Doors, Voice of the Martyrs, and World Help, which supply Bibles for smuggling or directly smuggle the Bibles themselves into lands where the Bibles or their distribution are prohibited.

Individual Bible smugglers include Andrew van der Bijl, David Hathaway, and John White.

Diocletianic Persecution 
During the Diocletianic Persecution, Bibles were targeted as part of a larger program intended to wipe out Christianity. On February 24, 303, Diocletian's first "Edict against the Christians" was published. Among other persecutions against Christians, Diocletian ordered the destruction of their scriptures and liturgical books across the entire Roman empire.

During the Middle Ages 
There were some controversies whether the translation in Old Church Slavonic was permissible. According to St. Methodius, he was officially allowed to use it by John VIII in 880. Yet Christians were forbidden to use the Old Church Slavonic translation by John X in 920 and by the Lateran Synod of 1059, with the synod being confirmed by Nicholas II and Alexander II. In a letter to Vratislav II of Bohemia dated 2 January 1080, Pope Gregory VII revoked his predecessors' permission to use the Slavonic language. The reason he gave was that "Not without reason has it pleased Almighty God that Holy Scripture should be a secret in certain places, lost, if it were plainly apparent to all men, perchance it would be little esteemed and be subject to disrespect; or it might be falsely understood by those of mediocre learning, and lead to error."

Between 1170–80, Peter Waldo commissioned a cleric from Lyon to translate the New Testament into the vernacular "Romance" (Franco-Provençal). He is credited with providing Western Europe the first translation of the Bible in a 'modern tongue' outside of Latin.

In 1199, Pope Innocent III, writing in a letter to the bishop of Metz, banned the reading the Bible in private meetings (which he labeled as occultis conventiculis, or "hidden assemblies"). However, he noted that the desire to read and study the divine scriptures, was not to blame, but rather it was a recommended disposition. Since, however, the individual by himself apart from private meetings could hardly procure Bible texts, this ban was practically equivalent to a Bible ban for lay people.

After the end of the Albigensian Crusade, the Council of Toulouse tightened the provisions against the heretics in this ecclesiastical province. The Inquisition was the first to work nationwide, and the University of Toulouse was founded, to which the Catholic Institute of Toulouse is also called. At the synod a general Bible ban was pronounced for lay people of this ecclesiastical province, only Psalterium and Brevier in Latin were allowed.

This quote was not repeated in 1233 at the Council held in Bréziers. Although sections of the Council Toulouse were used, this statement was omitted. In the course of a confirmation of the writings in 1215 at Fourth Council of the Lateran's condemnation of the writings of David of Dinant ordered Gregory IX. in 1231, to hand over all the theological books written in Latin to the diocesan bishops. At the Second Council of Tarragona (Conventus Tarraconensis) in 1234, the Spanish bishops, according to a decree of King James I of Aragon, declared that it was forbidden to anyone, to own a translation of the Bible. They had to be burned within eight days, otherwise, they were considered heretics.

At the diocesan synod of Trier (Synodus Dioecesana Trevirensis) convened by Archbishop Theodoric II in 1231, alleged heretics called Euchites were described as having translated the scriptures into German:

At the synod of Béziers (Concilium Biterrense) in 1246 it was also decided that the laity should have no Latin and vernacular and the clergy no vernacular theological books.

Charles IV, Holy Roman Emperor issued an edict against German interpretations of Scripture at the request of Pope Urban V 1369 in Lucca, This was in order that such interpreters would not seduce laymen and malevolent spirits to heresy or error. Nevertheless, his son started the handwritten Wenceslas Bible in 1385.

In 1376, Pope Gregory XI ordered that all literature on the Bible should be placed under ecclesiastical direction. As a result, only the Vulgate and a few poor quality translations in national languages were tolerated.

John Wycliffe (1330–1384), a theologian with pre-Reformation views, finished the first authoritative translation of the Bible from Latin into English in 1383. His teachings were rejected in 1381 by Oxford University and in 1382 by the church. For fear of a popular uprising Wycliffe was not charged. The translation of the Bible caused great unrest among the clergy, and for their sake, several defensive provincial synods were convened, such as the 3rd Council of Oxford (ended in 1408). Under the chairmanship of Archbishop Thomas Arundel, official positions against Wycliffe were written in the Oxford Constitution and Arundel Constitution. The latter reads as follows:

Unlike before, translations of liturgical readings and preaching texts (psalms, pericopes from the Gospels and Epistles) were now bound to an examination by church authorities. Individuals like William Butler wanted to go even further and also limit Bible translations to the Latin language alone. In 1401, Parliament passed the De heretico comburendo law in order to suppress Wycliffe's followers and censor their books, including the Bible translation. At the Council of Constance in 1415, Wycliffe was finally proclaimed a heretic and condemned as "that pestilent wretch of damnable memory, yea, the forerunner and disciple of anti-christ who, as the complement of his wickedness, invented a new translation of the Scriptures into his mother-tongue." His helpers Nicholas Hereford and John Purvey were forced to recant their teachings, and his bones, as determined by the council were finally burned in 1428. However, his translation of the Bible along with 200 manuscripts were secretly preserved and read by followers, and have survived to the present day. However, Wycliffe's Bible was not printed until 1731, when Wycliffe was historically conceived as the forefather of the English Reformation. The next English Bible translation was that of William Tyndale, whose Tyndale Bible had to be printed from 1525 outside England in areas of Germany sympathetic to Protestantism. Tyndale himself was sentenced to death at the stake because of his translation work. He was strangled in 1536 near Brussels and then burned.

From the printing press until the Reformation 

Around 1440–1450 Johannes Gutenberg invented a printing press with movable type, with which he produced the Gutenberg Bible. His invention quickly spread throughout Europe. In 1466 the Mentelin Bible was the first vernacular language Bible to be printed. It was a word-for-word translation from the Latin Vulgate.

Pope Paul II (pontificate 1464–1471) confirmed the decree of James I of Aragon on the prohibition of Bibles in vernacular languages. Under Isabella I of Castile and her husband Ferdinand II of Aragon, the printing of vernacular Bibles was prohibited in Spanish state law. The Spanish Inquisition which they instituted ordered the destruction of all Hebrew books and all vernacular Bibles in 1497. This was five years after the expulsion of the Jews from Spain. In 1498, the Inquisition stated that it was impossible to translate the Bible into a modern language without making mistakes that would plunge unskilled and especially new converts into doubts about faith.

The complete translation of the Bible into a Romance language, a transfer of the Vulgate into Valencian, was made by the Carthusian order general Bonifaci Ferrer (1355-1417) and was printed in 1478.

By letter of March 17, 1479, Sixtus IV authorized the rector and dean of the University of Cologne to intervene with ecclesiastical censors against printers, buyers and readers of heretical books. This authorization was approved by Pope Alexander VI. In several theological and non-theological books from this period a printing patent is included in the publications. From this time also printing patents of the Patriarch of Venice can be found. With the censorship of January 4, 1486 and an executive order of January 10, the Elector-Archbishop Berthold von Henneberg of Mainz can be considered a pioneer in censorship regulation in the German-speaking countries for Mainz, Erfurt, and Frankfurt. His censorship decisions did not concern secular topics, but instead targeted specific religious texts, especially translations from Latin and Greek into the German. Berthold was of the opinion that the German language was too poor to reproduce the precise and well-formulated Latin and Greek texts. Up to this time, no heretical writings had appeared printed in German, but since 1466 about ten relatively identical German Bible translations were completed. He commented:

In 1490 a number of Hebrew Bibles and other Jewish books were burned in Andalucía at the behest of the Spanish Inquisition.

16th century 
From 1516 to 1535, Erasmus of Rotterdam published several editions of his Novum Instrumentum omne. It was a double edition with both a new Latin version as well as the first print of the Greek text, which was reconstructed in a few places by back-translating Latin into Greek. In 1517 Luther published his Ninety-five Theses. In 1521 he was excommunicated with the bull Decet Romanum Pontificem, declared a heretic, and issued the Edict of Worms. In 1522, the first translation of Luther's New Testament was published. It was translated on the basis of the Greek text of Erasmus. In 1534 the entire Holy Scripture was printed, completing the Luther Bible.

At the Council of Trent, both Luther's and Erasmus's writings were put on the Index Librorum Prohibitorum. Later printed copies of the index explicitly banned their Bibles as well as any prior editions and in general all similar Bible editions:

The Edict of Worms against Luther was not enforced throughout the empire. In 1523, at the Reichstag in Nuremberg the papal nuncio Francesco Chieregati asked for the Holy Roman Empire to enforce the clause of the Lateran Council against printing any book without the permission of the local bishop or his representative. He also wanted the Edict of Worms to be enforced. Instead, on March 6, 1523, it was decreed that until the demanded church council could be held, local rulers themselves should ensure that no new writings were printed or sold in their territories unless they had been approved by reasonable men. Other writings, especially those of an insulting nature, were to be banned under severe punishment.

The 1529 Diet of Speyer limited its decrees essentially to repeating the resolutions of 1523 Diet of Augsburg. On May 13, 1530, the papal nuncio gave the Emperor a memorandum which recommended that the Edict of Worms and the bull of Leo X was to be implemented by imperial decree and on pain of punishment. Following the Protestation at Speyer at the conclusion of the Reichstag on November 19, 1530, it was decided that nothing should be printed without specifying the printer and the printing location. The nuncio's request had failed.

As part of the 1541 Diet of Regensburg which set the terms of the Regensburg Interim, the rule against publishing insults was repeated.

England 
In 1534, the Canterbury Convocation requested that the king commission a new translation of the Bible by suitable persons and authorize the reading of the new translation. Although the king did not designate translators, new translations appeared from 1535 and afterwards. In 1536 and 1538 Thomas Cromwell prescribed that Coverdale's translation of the Bible was to be placed in every church. These Bibles were to be printed in a large size and chained to prevent theft. This translation came to be called the "Great Bible" or "Chained Bible."

Index Librorum Prohibitorum 
Around this time, the papal Index Librorum Prohibitorum began to be developed. At the 1548 Diet of Augsburg, which pronounced the terms of the Augsburg Interim, the ordinance against insults was repeated and the previous provisions were extended to include the name of the author or poet. In addition, books were to be checked before printing by the "ordinary authority of every place." There was a sentiment against that which was "rebellious and ignominious or unruly or obnoxious to the Catholic Doctrine of the Holy Christian Church." The already printed books of Luther were to be suppressed. The Holy Roman Imperial Fiscal official was to intervene against the offending authorities. After the 1555 Peace of Augsburg ended the Augsburg Interim and increased religious freedom by declaring cuius regio, eius religio, the papal Index Librorum Prohibitorum was only observed as law in Catholic territories.

General Rules in the Roman Index 
Pius IV (pontificate 1559–1565) also added general rules to the Index Romanus. In the first printed and published version of 1559, there are 30 Latin editions of Scripture, 10 New Testament editions, and two short general rules for Bibles in foreign languages.

At the 18th meeting of the Council of Trent on 26 February 1562, it was decided to work out general indexing rules. On December 3 or 4th, 1563, the Council decided to submit its proposal, the Decretum de indice librorum, to the Pope for final adaptation. With the bull Dominici gregis custodiae the Index tridentinus was published on March 24, 1564 by the Pope. In it all the writings of all heresiarchs (all Reformers) were included on the index, regardless of whether they contained theology, religious words, or descriptions of nature. Especially on Bibles, Rules 3 and 4 came into play:

The rules were reprinted in each version until the reform in 1758. Believers were forbidden to make, read, own, buy, sell or give away these books on the basis of excommunication.

With this addition, the rule remained valid until 1758. How it was dealt with in each country was different. In a Catholic country like Bavaria, it was state law. In particular, booksellers had their licenses revoked for violating it. In contrast, in Württemberg, a refuge of Protestantism, the index functioned more like a blacklist. But it also found application in elite Catholic schools in secularized France until the 20th century. In general, secularized France almost never used the Roman Index.

17th–18th centuries

Unigenitus 
In 1713 Clement XI issued the bull Unigenitus dei filius in order to fight against Jansenism. The bull condemned 101 excerpts from the work Réflexions morales by Pasquier Quesnel, including the following propositions: 

This bull was controversial among the French clergy for various reasons. Among the reasons it was controversial was that it condemned various sentences from the Bible and the Fathers of the Church. But the 1719 bull Pastoralis officii threatened excommunication on all who did not submit to Unigenitus dei filius. The Lateran Council confirmed Benedict XIII's bull Unigenitus dei filius.

Punishments against violators 
As part of a program of persecution against the Salzburg Protestants, in 1731, Leopold Anton von Firmian – Archbishop of Salzburg as well as its temporal ruler as Count, ordered the wholesale seizure and burning of all Protestant books and Bibles.

On May 27, 1747 Jakob Schmidlin ("Sulzijoggi") was hanged as the leading head of a Bible movement in the canton of Lucerne in Galgenwäldli on the Emme. His corpse was burned along with a Luther Bible. He is considered the last Protestant martyr of Switzerland. Where his farm stood, a pillar was erected. Of over 100 co-defendants of this movement (from Ruswil, Wolhusen, Werthenstein, Menznau, Malters, Kriens, and Udligenswil), 82 of them were also punished, mostly with perpetual banishment. Since the Bible was at the center of this movement and violations of censorship rules against the use and possession of Bibles was one of the offenses committed by the convicted, after the trial the authorities issued a decree that included a general prohibition on laymen having Bibles:

19th–20th centuries 
In 1816, Pius VII sent two breves concerning the Bible societies. One to the archbishop of Gniezno and Primate of Poland (Nimio et Acerbo, June 29), and another to the archbishop of Mohilev (Magno et acerbo, September 3). Both breves are very strongly against the translations in vernacular of the Bible which were not approved by the Catholic Church and letting untrained laypeople read the bible. Magno et acerbo reads:

Leo XII's Ubi primum (3 May 1824) also did not exhibit any liberal attitudes, stating: "You have noticed a society, commonly called the Bible society, boldly spreading throughout the whole world. Rejecting the traditions of the holy Fathers and infringing the well-known decree of the Council of Trent, it works by every means to have the holy Bible translated, or rather mistranslated, into the ordinary languages of every nation. There are good reasons for fear that (as has already happened in some of their commentaries and in other respects by a distorted interpretation of Christ’s gospel) they will produce a gospel of men, or what is worse, a gospel of the devil!"

Pius VIII's Traditi humilitati nostrae (1829) states:

In 1836, Gregory XVI eliminated the relief made back in 1757. His encyclical letter Inter praecipuas of 1844 spoke out against vernacular Bibles of the Bible societies. Hans-Josef Klauck considers when commenting this encyclical that that "there is a deep wisdom in the previous Catholic practice to forbid the independent reading of the Bible in the vernacular to laymen, or only to allow it with considerable caution, because they ultimately threaten to undermine the teaching authority of the Church."

Pius IX wrote in 1846 his encyclical Qui pluribus against "the most impudent Bible societies, which renewed the ancient artifice of the heretics and translated the books of the Divine Scriptures, contrary to the most sacrosanct rules of the Church, into all national languages and often provided twisted explanations."

The situation in Nice was very different from the situation in the Duchy of Tuscany. The duchy had a reputation for being liberal during the rule of Leopold II, even prior to 1849. There were three Protestant churches within the duchy: one English, one Scottish and one French. The French Protestant church held fairs in the Italian language. After the brief period during the republic the subsequent counter-revolution, the liberal climate changed to conservative. On May 18, 1849, 3,000 copies of a Catholic Italian translation of the Bible were confiscated and burned under the orders of Antonio Martini, the Archbishop of Florence, even though they had been printed with permission. Persecution of Protestants increased. In 1851, services in Italian were outlawed. The possession of a Protestant Italian Bible alone was considered sufficient evidence for conviction. The most prominent prisoner was Count Piero Guicciardini, who was arrested with six others. They had met on May 7, 1851, the day before his voluntary departure for religious exile, and read the Scriptures together. He was therefore sentenced to six months imprisonment for blasphemy, which was then converted into exile.

In the Austrian Empire, the Patent of Toleration was published on October 13, 1781. In addition, on June 22, 1782, and October 12, 1782, Joseph II issued court decrees explicitly authorizing the import and printing of Protestant books and stipulating that previously confiscated publications should be returned as long as they were not abusive towards the Catholic Church. These decrees were usually followed, but the reforms were not always followed everywhere throughout the empire. In 1854 in Buda the police seized 121 Bibles found in a Protestant congregation and reduced 120 of them to pulp in a paper mill. In return the congregation was given 21 kreuzers due to the value of the books as pulp as well as the one remaining Bible, "which is enough for the pastor."

On December 7, 1859, in front of the Archbishop's Palace in Santa Fe de Bogotá in the then Granadine Confederation a great bible burning took place.

On January 25, 1896 Leo XIII issued new rules for the Roman Index with the Apostolic constitution Officiorum ac Munerum. It was published on January 25, 1897. It generally contained some more relaxed rules and no longer automatically included all the books written by Protestants. It namely states:

Brittany 
The first New Testament translation into Breton was published in 1827 by Protestants after the Catholic Church refused its publication.

United States 
In 1842, a Jesuit priest named Telman was responsible for the burning of a number of "Protestant" Bibles in Champlain, New York.

Nazi Germany 
In late August 1933, authorities used 25 trucks to transport about 70 tonnes of Watch Tower literature and Bibles to the city's outskirts and publicly burned them as part of a larger program of Persecution of Jehovah's Witnesses in Nazi Germany. Later on, in July 1935, state governments were instructed in July 1935 to confiscate all Watch Tower Society publications, including Bibles.

On November 9 and 10, 1938, thousands of Hebrew Bibles were burned in multiple communities in Germany as part of a program of persecution against Jews.

Canada 
In 1955, police seized Bibles and other literature when raiding a house while Jehovah's Witnesses were worshiping there. The Jehovah's Witnesses successfully sued in response.

China 

When the economic reforms implemented by Deng Xiaoping created greater openness to the West, Christians of various affiliations began smuggling Bibles and Christian literature into China. The CCP viewed the recipients of those Bibles as engaging in illegal activity in violation of the principle of not accepting aid from Western sources.

Taiwan 
For two years in the 1950s, churches were banned from using Chinese Bibles written with Latin letters instead of Chinese characters. The ban was lifted with an encouragement to use Chinese characters. A 1973 Taiwanese translation of the New Testament was the product of cooperation between Protestants and Catholics. It was confiscated in 1975, also for using Latin letters.

Russia 
In Russia, the activities of the Bible Society in Russia were greatly limited after Czar Nicholas I placed the society under the control of Orthodox church authorities. Following the 1917 Bolshevik Revolution, no Bibles were published until 1956, and even then the circulation was limited until the 1990s.

Soviet Union 

Aldis Purs, wrote that in the Estonian Soviet Socialist Republic as well as the Latvian Socialist Soviet Republic, some evangelical Christian clergy attempted to resist the Soviet policy of state atheism by engaging in anti-regime activities such as Bible smuggling.

The Marxist-Leninist atheistic and antireligious legislation of the Soviet Union "discouraged religious activity to the point that it was essentially forced out of public life." A team led by Ken Howard engaged in Bible smuggling into the USSR and later, published copies of the Bible through screen-printing methods "using fabric smuggled in as curtain material or worn as petticoats, [which] allowed pages to be printed without being noticed." Seventy-five operations were established throughout the USSR, with more than one million pages being printed. In 2021, the Museum of the Bible in Washington, D.C. erected an exhibit on this Bible smuggling and screen-printing activity of Ken Howard and his team.

21st century

Islamic states 
In some, mostly Muslim states, censorship of the Bible exists today, such as in Saudi Arabia where the distribution of non-Muslim religious materials such as Bibles is illegal.

Afghanistan

Afghan Christians practice in secret. Bibles are not sold publicly.

Libya

Importing & distributing Bibles is illegal, as is evangelism.

Malaysia 
The Prime Minister clarified in April 2005 that there was no ban on Bibles translated into Malay, although they are required to be stamped with a disclaimer "Not for Muslims". The word translated in English as "God" is translated as "Allah" in some Malay Bibles, which is illegal as non-Muslims are prohibited from using the term "Allah." In March 2010, the Malaysian Home Ministry seized 30,000 Malay language bibles from a port in Kuching, Sarawak.

A lawsuit was filed by the Roman Catholic Archdiocese of Kuala Lumpur against the Government of Malaysia at the High Court of Malaya to seek a declaratory relief that the word "Allah" should not be exclusive to Islam. However, in 2014 the Federal Court of Malaysia ruled that non-Muslims could not use the term "Allah," and 321 Bibles were subsequently seized.

Maldives

According to the UK government, it is an offense to import Bibles into the Maldives due to local Islamic religious laws.

Somalia

Christians practice in secret, and it is illegal to own a Bible.

U.S. military 

In 2009, the U.S. military burned Bibles in the Pashto and Dari languages, which were seemingly intended for distribution among the locals, which is in breach of regulations which forbid "proselytizing of any religion, faith or practice".

U.S. schools 
Likewise, when the use of the Bible by staff in U.S. public schools was restricted (along with teacher-led prayers), this prohibition was also commonly referred to as a "Bible ban".

Canon 825 of the Catholic Church 
Today Canon 825 governs Catholic Bible translations:

Russia 
In 2015, Russia banned importation of the Jehovah's Witnesses' New World Translation of the Holy Scriptures. On May 5, 2015, customs authorities in Russia seized a shipment of religious literature containing Ossetian-language Bibles published by Jehovah's Witnesses. Russian customs officials in the city of Vyborg held up a shipment of 2,013 Russian-language copies of Bibles on July 13, 2015. Customs authorities confiscated three of the Bibles, sent them to an "expert" to study the Bibles to determine whether they contained "extremist" language, and impounded the rest of the shipment.

China 

The state-owned Amity Press is the only publisher allowed to print Bibles in China that are not for export. The quantity printed is restricted, and the sale or distribution of Bibles is limited to officially sanctioned churches, with online sales having been recently cracked down upon.

The Associated Press reported in September 2018 that the current suppression program in China includes the burning of Bibles.

Singapore

Singapore has banned Bibles and other literature published by the publishing arms of the Jehovah's Witnesses. A person in possession of banned literature can be fined up to S$2,000 (US$1,333) and jailed up to 12 months for a first conviction.

In February 1995, Singapore police seized Bibles during a raid and arrested 69 Jehovah's Witnesses, many of whom went to prison. In March 1995, 74-year-old Yu Nguk Ding was arrested for carrying two "undesirable publications", one of them a Bible printed by the Watch Tower Society.

Notes

References 

Bible
Book censorship
Christianity-related controversies